Spirit Mountain may refer to the following places:

Spirit Mountain (Montana), U.S.
Spirit Mountain (Nevada), U.S.
Spirit Mountain Wilderness
Spirit Mountain (ski area), in Duluth, Minnesota, U.S.

See also
Spirit Mountain Casino (disambiguation)